Acianthera aphthosa is a species of orchid. It was first described by John Lindley in 1838 as Pleurothallis aphthosa, but was assigned to the genus, Acianthera, in 2001 by Pridgeon and Mark W. Chase. It is native to Bolivia, Brazil, Colombia, Ecuador, Paraguay, and Peru.

References

External links

aphthosa
Plants described in 1838